The 2020–21 Virginia Tech Hokies women's basketball team represented Virginia Polytechnic Institute and State University during the 2020–21 NCAA Division I women's basketball season. The Hokies, led by fifth year head coach Kenny Brooks, played their home games at Cassell Coliseum as members of the Atlantic Coast Conference.

The Hokies finished the season 15–10 and 8–8 in ACC play to finish in seventh place. In the ACC tournament, they defeated to Miami in the Second Round before losing to eventual champions NC State in the Quarterfinals.  They received an at-large bid to the NCAA tournament where they were the seven seed in the Riverwalk Regional.  In the tournament they defeated ten seed  in the First Round before losing to two seed Baylor in the Second Round to end their season.

Previous season
They finished the 2019–20 season 21–9 and 11–7 in ACC play to finish in a tie for fourth place.  As the fifth seed in the ACC tournament, they lost to Wake Forest in the Second Round.  The NCAA tournament and WNIT were cancelled due to the COVID-19 outbreak.

Off-season

Departures

Incoming transfers

Recruiting Class

Source:

Roster

Schedule

Source:

|-
!colspan=6 style=| Non-conference regular season

|-
!colspan=6 style=| ACC regular season

|-
!colspan=6 style=| ACC Women's Tournament

|-
!colspan=6 style=";"| NCAA tournament

Rankings
2020–21 NCAA Division I women's basketball rankings

See also
 2020–21 Virginia Tech Hokies men's basketball team

References

Virginia Tech
Virginia Tech
Virginia Tech
Virginia Tech Hokies women's basketball seasons
Virginia Tech